Ridgemoor Country Club is a country club located near Chicago, Illinois. It hosted the Hale America National Open Golf Tournament in 1942. Along with golf, the club also has swimming and tennis facilities.

History
The greatest competitive moment in Ridgemoor's history came to fruition in 1942. The Hale America National Open was arranged to replace the United States Open that was canceled due to World War II, and would be staged at Ridgemoor Country Club. Sponsored by the Chicago District Golf Association, the United States Golf Association and the PGA of America, the Hale America raised over $20,000 for the Navy Relief Society and USO, and achieved legendary status thanks to its winner. Ben Hogan's 17 under par 271 across the four days, including a course record 62 in the second round, captured the Hale America by three strokes over Jimmy Demaret and Mike Turnesa. The tournament has gained some infamy, as debates ensue if the Hale America should be regarded as a U.S. Open. Officially, it is not recognized as such.

In later years, Hogan would sometimes argue that his win at the Hale America was a de facto fifth U.S. Open win, joining victories in 1948, 1950, 1951 and 1953. That said, Hogan regarded his win at Ridgemoor with pride, and the Club, having hosted the only Hale America to be played, and having Hogan as its winner, has always felt the same way.

Holes

References

Golf clubs and courses in Illinois
1905 establishments in Illinois
Sports venues completed in 1905